Joanne A. F. Conaghan,  is an Irish legal scholar based in the UK, specialising in the intersection between gender and the law and in feminist legal studies. Since 2013, she has been Professor of Law at the University of Bristol. She previously taught at the University of Kent, the University of Exeter and the University of California, San Diego. She was head of the University of Kent Law School from 2008 to 2011 and head of the University of Bristol Law School from 2014 to 2018.

In 2021, Conaghan was elected a Fellow of the British Academy (FBA), the United Kingdom's national academy for the humanities and social sciences. She is chair of the Law Sub-Panel for REF 2021, the United Kingdom's research excellence assessment exercise.

Selected works

References

Living people
British legal scholars
Academics of the University of Bristol
Academics of the University of Kent
Academics of the University of Exeter
University of California, San Diego faculty
Fellows of the British Academy
Fellows of the Academy of Social Sciences
Year of birth missing (living people)